Ledge Cemetery, also known as the Cemetery under the Ledge, is a historic cemetery in Yarmouth, Maine, United States. Some headstones bear dates earlier than 1770, for many burials — such as that of Revd. Nicholas Loring — were removed from the older cemetery

The original First Parish Congregational Church, known as the Old Ledge Meetinghouse, stood near the site between 1730 and 1818. Its first pastor was Reverend Ammi Ruhamah Cutter. Tristram Gilman, for whom Gilman Road is named, was the fourth pastor. He served in the role for forty years, and was buried in the Ledge Cemetery upon his death in 1809, aged 73. His wife, Elizabeth Sayer, is buried beside him.

Several sea captains are also interred here, including those from the Drinkwater family. Captain Theophilus Drinkwater, son of Allen and Hannah Drinkwater, gave his name to nearby Drinkwater Point Road. 

Of a settlement that originally contained a school, a tavern and a cemetery, only the cemetery and the ledge doorstep of the church remain.

Notable burials
Ammi Ruhamah Cutter (1705–1746), first pastor of the Old Ledge Meetinghouse
Reverend Nicholas Loring (1711–1763), second pastor of the Old Ledge Meetinghouse; died in the role
Honorable Jeremiah Powell (1720–1784), in the now-unmarked Powell tomb behind that of deacon Jacob Mitchell
Jacob Mitchell (1696–1784), deacon
Tristram Gilman (1735–1809), fourth pastor of the church that formerly stood on the site, namesake of Gilman Road
Captain Cushing Prince Jr. (1786–1869), sea captain
Captain Reuben Prince (1792–1870), sea captain
Captain Theophilus Drinkwater (1792–1872), namesake of Drinkwater Point Road
Giles Loring (1813–1893), shipwright

Gallery

References

1770 establishments in the Thirteen Colonies
Cemeteries in Yarmouth, Maine